Development of doctrine is a term used by John Henry Newman and other theologians influenced by him to describe the way Catholic teaching has become more detailed and explicit over the centuries, while later statements of doctrine remain consistent with earlier statements.

Newman's Formulation
The term was introduced in Newman's 1845 book An Essay on the Development of Christian Doctrine. Newman used the idea of development of doctrine to defend Catholic teaching from attacks by some Anglicans and other Protestants, who saw certain elements in Catholic teaching as corruptions or innovations. He relied on an  extensive study of early Church Fathers in tracing the elaboration or development of doctrine which he argued was in some way implicitly present in the Divine Revelation  in Sacred Scripture and Tradition which was present from the beginnings of the Church.

He argued that various Catholic doctrines not accepted by Protestants (such as devotion to the Blessed Virgin Mary, or Purgatory) had a developmental history analogous to doctrines that were accepted by Protestants (such as the Trinity or the divinity and humanity of Christ). Such developments were, in his view, the natural and beneficial consequences of reason working on the original revealed truth to draw out consequences that were not obvious at first. This thinking of Newman had a major impact on the Bishops at the Second Vatican Council, and appears in their statement that ″the understanding of the things and words handed down grows, through the contemplation and study of believers, ... (which) tends continually towards the fullness of divine truth."

As distinct from evolution of dogmas
There is a more radical understanding of development of doctrine that is known as evolution of dogmas. This view, mixed in with philosophical currents such as vitalism, immanentism and historicism, was at the heart of the modernist controversy during the papacy of Pius X, and was condemned in the encyclical Pascendi dominici gregis. Although modernist intellectuals such as George Tyrrell and Alfred Loisy did at times cite the influence of Newman's ideas on their thinking, their goal was not so much to understand the ancient roots of Church doctrine but to make it change meaning, according to their own ideas in the liberal spirit of the times.

Protestantism
Many Protestants, particularly those influenced by Mercersburg Theology, believe in doctrinal development and see the Reformation itself as an example of it. In Philip Schaff's inaugural address as a professor at German Reformed Seminary, he described the Reformation as "the legitimate offspring, the greatest act of the Catholic Church". In addition, the Protestant slogan Semper reformanda implies a form of ongoing doctrinal development.

Eastern Orthodoxy
Archpriest Oleg Davydenkov wrote: "This theory is very convenient for Western Christians, because it makes it easy to justify arbitrary dogmatic innovations of both the Roman Catholic Church and Protestant denominations. On the one hand, this theory seems quite logical, but on the other — it leads to paradoxical conclusions. In this case, we will have to admit, for example, that the Church of the time of the apostles and even the holy apostles themselves knew incomparably less about God than any modern Christian who attended a course of dogmatics. Naturally, it is impossible to agree with such an understanding of the problem".

Daniel Lattier has argued that some older Eastern Orthodox thinkers did not reject the concept outright, and that Eastern Orthodoxy may allow a form of doctrinal development, albeit more limited than Western forms of it.

See also  
 Thomas Bayes  
 Bayes' theorem  
 Bayesian probability 
 Grammar of Assent  
 Probabiliorism
 Progressive revelation (Christianity)

Notes

References  
 John Henry Newman. An Essay on the Development of Christian Doctrine. (1845, revised 1878).      

Catholic theology and doctrine